The 2016–17 season of the Kazakhstan Cola Kazakhstani Futsal Championship is the 19th season of top-tier futsal in Kazakhstan.

2016–17 season teams

Final table

Top scorers

See also
2016-17 Kazakhstani Futsal First Division
2016 Kazakhstan Futsal Cup

References

Kazakhstani Futsal Championship
Kazakhstan
2016 in Kazakhstani football
2017 in Kazakhstani football